Bachelor (alternative title Bachelor: The Circle) is a 2004 Bangladeshi comedy-drama-romance film directed by Mostofa Sarwar Farooki, in his feature directorial debut. It stars Humayun Faridi, Ahmed Rubel, Ferdous Ahmed, and Hasan Masood. The film was released on January 31, 2004, in Bangladesh. Aupee Karim's performance, in her feature film debut, won the Bangladesh National Film Award for Best Actress.

Cast

Production
Mostofa Sarwar Farooki and screenwriter Anisul Haque had previously collaborated on a number of television serials such as  Ekannaborti. Given a five-page synopsis by Farooki, Haque wrote approximately three drafts of the script, not counting minor revisions.

Farooki cast several actors from Ekannaborti, including Arman Parvez Murad, Aupee Karim, Moutushi, and Dilara Zaman. Journalist Hasan Masood was hired despite having no previous acting experience. In addition to Masood, Bachelor was the feature film debut of Murad, Karim, Moutushi, Marzuk Russel, Jaya Masood, and Sumaiya Shimu.

Bachelor was also television director Farooki's feature film directorial debut. He had neither formal training in film nor practical experience with it. Reflecting on the filming four films later, in 2012, he said, "At that time I had no video monitor, and couldn't really see anything, so it was difficult for me to understand the medium." "I had a hard time crafting my images." It was an opportunity for him to make mistakes and learn from them.

Release
Bachelor was released at Balaka cinema hall in Dhaka, Bangladesh on 31 January 2004. Two days later, on Eid al-Adha, it was broadcast on Bangladeshi television network Channel i, a sister firm of production company Impress Telefilm. It did not receive a wide theatrical distribution outside Bangladesh, but was shown at two festivals, Asiatica Film Mediale in Rome and the Third Eye Asian Film Festival in Mumbai.

The film was widely watched by the Bangladeshi middle class, according to professor in media and communication Zakir Hossain Raju. The story of romantic relationships among urban youths resonated with the young generation. Harun ur Rashid, writing in The Daily Star, said it marked a "'Good-bye' to the cliché melodramatic dhishoom-dhishoom movies" audiences were accustomed to. Matthew Scott, summarizing Farooki's output for Agence France Presse a decade later, wrote, "What makes Farooki's work different is its contemporary take on the lives and troubles of young Bangladeshis."

For her performance as Fahim's girlfriend, Karim won Best Actress at the 29th Bangladesh National Film Awards.

Music

Personnel
Music
 Ayub Bachchu
 Pablo
 Bappa Mazumder
 S.I. Tutul

Vocals
 Ayub Bachchu
 Asif
 Sanjeeb Chowdhury
 Pothik Nobi
 Pantho Kanai
 S.I. Tutul
 Hasan Masood

Lyrics
 Marzuk Russell
 Kamruzzaman Kamu
 Kabir Bakul

References

External links
 

Bengali-language Bangladeshi films
Films directed by Mostofa Sarwar Farooki
2004 romantic comedy-drama films
2004 films
Bangladeshi romantic comedy-drama films
2000s Bengali-language films
2004 comedy films
2004 drama films
Impress Telefilm films